XPE may refer to:
Windows XP Embedded, Microsoft's embedded operating system
XPE (DDB2)